Elizabeth Engstrom is an American speculative fiction writer.

Biography
She was born Bette Lynn (Betsy) Gutzmer, but she legally changed her name to Elizabeth Engstrom a few years after publishing her first novel under that pseudonym. She is married to Al Cratty, and sometimes writes under the name Liz Cratty as well. She was nominated for a 1992 Bram Stoker Award for Best Fiction Collection for her book Nightmare Flower. Her anthology Dead on Demand: The Best of Ghost Story Weekend spent six months on the Library Journal "Best Seller List." Her short story, "Crosley", was picked to be included in The Thirteenth Annual Year's Best Fantasy and Horror, edited by Ellen Datlow. Her work has been published in The Magazine of Fantasy & Science Fiction, Horror Show, American Fantasy Magazine, and Cemetery Dance.

Elizabeth Engstrom also gives writing seminars on subjects like Structural Fiction, Sensual Fiction, Kick Start Your Novel, and The Architecture of Fiction. She was the owner of TripleTree Publishing, but she sold the business to Richard Ramsey in 2007. Under Engstrom's aegis, TripleTree published 19 books and put more than 200 authors in print for the first time.

She was an instructor and eventually Director of the Maui Writers Retreat and its Department of Continuing Education. She has her Bachelor of Arts in Literature and Writing, a Master's in Applied Theology and a Certificate of Pastoral Care and Ministry, all from Marylhurst University.

She gives a large portion of book sales on her website to the Melanoma Research Foundation. She was a founding member of Wordcrafters in Eugene, a literary community, and is a former faculty member at the University of Phoenix.

Engstrom's novel Candyland has been adapted as a film by Motorcycle Boy Productions of Vancouver, B.C., written and directed by Rusty Nixon, starring James Clayton, Chelah Horsdal and Gary Busey. The film Candiland was released in February 2017.

Her novel When Darkness Loves Us has been optioned for film by Light in the Dark Productions.

Recently, her two first books, When Darkness Loves Us, and Black Ambrosia, were re-released by Valancourt Books, with introductions by Grady Hendrix, as a part of their Paperbacks from Hell imprint.

Valancourt has recently republished a volume of her short stories, Nightmare Flower

Selected works

Novels
 Lizzie Borden
 When Darkness Loves Us, foreword by Theodore Sturgeon (William Morrow, 1985)
 Black Ambrosia (Tor Books, 1986)
 Lizard Wine 
 Black Leather 
 Candyland 
 The Northwoods Chronicles 
 York's Moon (February 2011) 
 Baggage Claim (February 2013) ASIN B00BDSS3FW
 Guys Named Bob (October 2018) 
 The Itinerant (November 2021)

Short story collections
 The Alchemy of Love (introduced by Jack Ketchum and illustrated by Alan M. Clark)
 Nightmare Flower (Tor Books) (Valancourt Books)
 Suspicions

Anthologies
 Mota 9: Addiction
 Imagination Fully Dilated co-edited with Alan M. Clark
 Imagination Fully Dilated Volume II co-edited with Alan M. Clark
 Dead on Demand: The Best of Ghost Story Weekend

Nonfiction
 The Maui Writers Conference Presents: Word by Word: An Inspirational Look at the Craft of Writing co-authored with John Tullius (also features Terry Brooks, Jackie Collins, Michael Eberhardt, Richard Paul Evans, Ernest J. Gaines, Julie Garwood, Elizabeth George, David Guterson, Tony Hillerman, Susan Isaacs, Ridley Pearson, Nicholas Sparks, Mitch Albom, Kenneth C. Davis, Ron Howard, Ron Bass, Mike Scully and many more). 
 How to Write a Sizzling Sex Scene (2015)
 Divorce by Grand Canyon (2019)

Lectures on audio
Elizabeth Engstrom has made some of her seminars available on CD and cassette
 The Art of the Short Story
 Writing a Well-Crafted Sex Scene
 Creating Memorable Characters

References

External links and references

 
 Blog
 
 

20th-century American novelists
American women short story writers
1951 births
Living people
Marylhurst University alumni
21st-century American novelists
Women horror writers
20th-century American women writers
21st-century American women writers
American women novelists
People from Elmhurst, Illinois
Novelists from Illinois
20th-century American short story writers
21st-century American short story writers
Pseudonymous women writers
20th-century pseudonymous writers
21st-century pseudonymous writers